Tha'er Fayed Al Bawab (born 1 March 1985) is a Jordanian footballer who plays as a forward for Spanish club AD Villaviciosa de Odón.

He spent most of his professional career in Spain and Romania.

Club career

Early years / Real Madrid
Born in Amman of Palestinian descent, Bawab's family moved to Catalonia, Spain when he was a child. He started playing for the youth teams of local UE Cornellà, leaving at the age of 18 to Real Madrid where he completed his development, and scoring 30 goals in his sole season with the Juvenil side.

In 2004, Bawab signed a professional contract with Real Madrid, and the club also agreed to pay a college scholarship for him, as he went on to make his senior debut with the third team in the fourth division. At that time, talks had started where people compared his style of play to Zinedine Zidane (even though they did not play in the same position); first-team coach Mariano García Remón thought about promoting him to the main squad, but eventually did not saying he did not want to put pressure on the youngster.

Barcelona / Journeyman in Spain
Bawab split the 2006–07 season with Real Madrid Castilla – for whom he did not appear officially – and another reserve team, FC Barcelona Atlètic, scoring three goals for the latter as both sides suffered relegation (the former in the second level, the latter in the third).

In the following three seasons, he competed in the country's third tier, being relegated with all the clubs – CE L'Hospitalet, CD Alfaro (which he joined in January 2009) and Moratalla CF.

Romania
Bawab signed a two-year contract with ACF Gloria 1922 Bistriţa in late June 2010. Midway through the season, as his team would eventually suffer relegation, he joined fellow Romanian Liga I side CS Gaz Metan Mediaş.

On 4 August 2011, Bawab scored two goals against 1. FSV Mainz 05 in the last qualifying round in the UEFA Europa League, one in each leg as Gaz Metan eventually won on penalties. On 26 September, he added two more in a 2–1 league home win over FCM Târgu Mureș.

In September 2014, free agent Bawab moved to CS Universitatea Craiova also in Romania's top flight. He remained in the country the following years safe for a very brief spell in the Qatar Stars League with Umm Salal SC, representing FC Steaua București, FC Dinamo București, CS Concordia Chiajna and FC Dunărea Călărași.

International career
Bawab made his debut for Jordan in a friendly with Norway on 28 January 2005, which ended 0–0. He made six appearances for the national team in the 2010 FIFA World Cup qualifiers, scoring once.

Career statistics

Club

International goals

Honours
Real Madrid C
Tercera División: 2005–06

Steaua București
Cupa Ligii: 2015–16

Dinamo București
Cupa Ligii: 2016–17

References

External links

1985 births
Living people
Lebanese Jordanian
Jordanian people of Lebanese descent
Jordanian people of Palestinian descent
Sportspeople from Amman
Sportspeople of Lebanese descent
Jordanian footballers
Palestinian footballers
Footballers from Catalonia
Association football forwards
Segunda División B players
Tercera División players
Tercera Federación players
UE Cornellà players
Real Madrid C footballers
Real Madrid Castilla footballers
FC Barcelona Atlètic players
CE L'Hospitalet players
Liga I players
Liga II players
ACF Gloria Bistrița players
CS Gaz Metan Mediaș players
CS Universitatea Craiova players
FC Steaua București players
FC Dinamo București players
CS Concordia Chiajna players
FC Dunărea Călărași players
Qatar Stars League players
Umm Salal SC players
Jordan international footballers
Jordanian expatriate footballers
Expatriate footballers in Spain
Expatriate footballers in Romania
Expatriate footballers in Qatar
Jordanian expatriate sportspeople in Spain
Jordanian expatriate sportspeople in Romania
Jordanian expatriate sportspeople in Qatar